Nesogenes is a genus of flowering plants belonging to the family Orobanchaceae.

Its native range is Eastern Tropical Africa, Western Indian Ocean, Pacific.

Species:

Nesogenes africanus 
Nesogenes decumbens 
Nesogenes euphrasioides 
Nesogenes glandulosus 
Nesogenes madagascariensis 
Nesogenes orerensis 
Nesogenes prostrata 
Nesogenes rotensis 
Nesogenes tenuis

References

Orobanchaceae
Orobanchaceae genera